8th Corps, Eighth Corps, or VIII Corps may refer to:
 VIII Corps (Grande Armée), a unit of the Imperial French army during the Napoleonic Wars
VIII Army Corps (German Confederation)
 VIII Corps (German Empire), a unit of the Imperial German Army prior to and during World War I
 VIII Reserve Corps (German Empire), a unit of the Imperial German Army during World War I
8th Air Corps (Germany)
VIII Army Corps (Wehrmacht), Germany
 VIII Corps (Ottoman Empire)
8th Army Corps (Russian Empire)
8th Air Defence Corps, Soviet Union and Russia
 8th Cavalry Corps (Soviet Union)
8th Mechanized Corps (Soviet Union)
 8th Estonian Rifle Corps a unit of the Soviet Army
 8th Army Corps (Ukraine)
 VIII Corps (United Kingdom)
 VIII Corps (United States)
 VIII Corps (Union Army), a unit in the American Civil War
 Eighth Army Corps (Spanish–American War)
8th Corps (Yugoslav Partisans)
 VIII Corps, part of Ground Operations Command, South Korea

See also
List of military corps by number
 8th Army (disambiguation)
 8th Brigade (disambiguation)
 8th Division (disambiguation)
 8th Regiment (disambiguation)
 8 Squadron (disambiguation)